Li Yijiang (born 1980 in Changji, Xinjiang – August 20, 2004), also known as Li Wenjiang (李文江), was a Chinese serial killer who killed seven people in the early 2000s.

Background
Hailing from Changji, Li was admitted to the Beijing Institute of Technology in 1999, majoring in computer science. In the next semester, he began to work part-time. In the second year of his sophomore year, he dropped out of school and was arrested in 2003. He was executed on August 20, 2004.

Li committed his first murder when he was 14. He committed his next crime in 2002. In that year, he was raped by four men and decided to kill them for revenge, killing two others as well. Li's murder method was to cut off the victim's sexual organs. Expert analysis showed that he wasn't cared for during his childhood, and so he went down the murderous path.

Youth 
Since childhood, he was raised by grandmother in Shandong, and one day he was sent back to his parents in Xinjiang. His mother had been diagnosed with a mental illness, which made her lose her temper, lick things and beat Li at home. During this time, he was scared to be around his mother. After he began to attend high school, his mother's condition was stabilized, but his father began drinking alcohol excessively. Despite Li complaining about this, he was not beaten, but on several occasions his father picked up a kitchen knife and threatened his son.

See also 
 List of serial killers by country

References 

1980 births
2004 deaths
20th-century Chinese LGBT people
21st-century Chinese LGBT people
21st-century executions by China
Beijing Institute of Technology alumni
Executed Chinese serial killers
Chinese gay men
Male serial killers
People executed by China by firearm
Violence against men in Asia